The Grand Duchy of Oldenburg and the United States began mutual recognition in 1829 but never established formal relations. Relations continued when the Duchy joined the German Empire in 1871. Relations would eventually end with World War I when the U.S. declared war on Germany.

History
Recognition began on December 2, 1829, when U.S. Secretary of State Martin Van Buren issued an exequatur to Frederick A. Mensch Esq. as Consul for Augustus, Grand Duke of Oldenburg at New York.

On March 10, 1847, the United States and the Grand Duchy of Oldenburg signed the Declaration of Accession to the Treaty of Commerce and Navigation with Hanover, to regulate trade, commerce, and navigation between the U.S. and Oldenburg. The declaration was signed by U.S. Special Agent Ambrose Dudley Mann and Oldenburg’s head of Foreign Affairs, W.E. de Beaulieu Marconnay.

On December 30, 1853, the Grand Duchy of Oldenburg signed the Declaration of Accession to the Convention for the Extradition of Criminals, Fugitives from Justice, of June 16, 1852, Between the United States and Prussia and Other States of the Germanic Confederation, to establish reciprocal extradition of fugitive criminals in special cases.

In 1867, the Grand Duchy joined the North German Confederation as a result of the Austro-Prussian War and continued relations under the Confederation. Relations further continued when it joined with the German Empire in 1871, but ended with the outbreak of the First World War and the American declaration of war against Germany.

See also

 Foreign relations of the United States
 Germany–United States relations
 Grand Duchy of Baden–United States relations
 Kingdom of Bavaria–United States relations
 Duchy of Brunswick-Lüneburg–United States relations
 Kingdom of Hanover–United States relations
 German Empire–United States relations
 Hanseatic Republics–United States relations
 Grand Duchy of Hesse–United States relations
 Grand Duchy of Mecklenburg-Schwerin–United States relations
 Grand Duchy of Mecklenburg-Strelitz–United States relations
 Duchy of Nassau–United States relations
 North German Confederation–United States relations
 Principality of Schaumburg-Lippe–United States relations
 Kingdom of Württemberg–United States relations

References

United States
Bilateral relations of the United States
Germany–United States relations